Horațiu Moldovan (born 20 January 1998) is a Romanian professional footballer who plays as a goalkeeper for Liga I club Rapid București.

Early life
During his childhood, Moldovan was passionate about karting, engines and speed. He stated that he saw his first football at age seven, and "From that moment on, football was everything".

Club career

Early career
He started football at CFR Cluj, where he failed to make his debut, being loaned to Hermannstadt and Viitorul Târgu Jiu. In 2019, he was transferred to Ripensia Timisoara.

UTA Arad
At the age of 22, Horațiu Moldovan scored his first match in League 1. He was in the foreground, being the man of the match Viitorul Constanta - UTA Arad, the score being 1-1, helping his team to get a point. After the first game, he became a reserve, leaving for Rapid Bucharest.

Rapid București
On 6 January 2021, he signed with Rapid where he would become the main goalkeeper of the club from Giulesti. In the first season on the first stage of Romanian football, he impressed, becoming one of the best goalkeepers of the first division, making some amazing interventions. In the 2021–22 season, Horațiu Moldovan conceded 21 goals in 21 matches in League 1, managing nine games without conceding a goal, Horațiu Moldovan was one of six footballers in League 1 to get all the minutes on the pitch in the 2021–2022 season. Being summoned to the national team. Horațiu Moldovan was elected, by the votes of the rapidist supporters, the player of the year 2021 of the Rapid.

Career statistics

Club

International

Honours
Hermannstadt
Liga III: 2016–17

References

External links

Living people
1998 births
Sportspeople from Cluj-Napoca
Romanian footballers
Association football goalkeepers
Liga I players
Liga II players
Liga III players
CFR Cluj players
FC Hermannstadt players
ACS Viitorul Târgu Jiu players
FC Ripensia Timișoara players
Sepsi OSK Sfântu Gheorghe players
FC UTA Arad players
FC Rapid București players
Romania international footballers